Tuntunir Boi or The Tailor Bird's Book is a collection of children's stories by Upendrakishore Raychowdhury published in 1911. The stories are about a clever tailorbird who outsmarts a king, a barber and a cat. Other stories in the collection are also about encounters between different animals, and how wits win the day.

References

External links
 Tuntunir Boi (Internet Archive)

1911 children's books
Bengali-language literature
Indian children's literature